Acaena exigua is an extinct species of flowering plant in the rose family known by the common name liliwai. It was endemic to Hawaii, where it was known from Kauai and west Maui. It had not been seen or collected since 1957 and was feared extinct until 1997, when one plant was discovered in a remote montane bog on Maui. The plant died in 2000, and the species is now considered extinct.

Reason for extinction
The reason for extinction is unknown.  While it has been ascribed to rooting by pigs, feral populations have only been present in the vicinity of the population on Kauai for some twenty years, and West Maui is pig-free.

References

External links
USDA Plants Profile
The Nature Conservancy

exigua
Endemic flora of Hawaii